The 2009–10 Toronto Raptors season was the 15th season of the Canadian franchise in the National Basketball Association (NBA). The Raptors were the busiest team in preseason transactions, replacing the previous season's entire roster with the exception of Chris Bosh, Andrea Bargnani, José Calderón, Patrick O'Bryant and Marcus Banks. Although the Raptors were chasing the fourth playoff seed at one point, they capitulated after the All-Star break, and eventually lost the eighth and final playoff spot to Chicago. Following the season, Bosh would sign as a free agent with the Miami Heat.

Roster

Summary

Preseason

The Raptors entered the 2009–10 NBA season in a state of flux: they had failed to qualify for the 2009 NBA Playoffs; it was Jay Triano's first full season in charge; and there was much uncertainty over the futures of perennial All-Star and captain Chris Bosh (who was into the final year of his contract), as well as Shawn Marion and Anthony Parker, both of whom could possibly become free agents before the season began. The roster shakeup began on 9 June 2009, when three-point specialist Jason Kapono ended his two-year tenure with the Raptors, and was traded to the Philadelphia 76ers for the aggressive veteran forward Reggie Evans. Toronto then drafted DeMar DeRozan with the ninth pick, enabling them to fill a spot on the wings. The other major roster change came in the form of signing free agent Hedo Türkoğlu; this led to a sign-and-trade agreement involving four teams, with Toronto landing Devean George (who was later traded for Marco Belinelli) and Antoine Wright, while trading Marion, Kris Humphries and Nathan Jawai. Around the same time, Parker signed with the Cleveland Cavaliers, while Indiana point guard Jarrett Jack was signed to back up José Calderón and former Raptor Radoslav Nesterović was brought back to the fold. Finally, Carlos Delfino and Roko Ukić were moved to the Milwaukee Bucks for Amir Johnson and Sonny Weems. It became increasingly clear that Colangelo, in securing a credible nucleus for the future, was doing this to persuade Bosh to stay.

Regular season

The Raptors opened their season with a 101–91 home win over LeBron James' Cleveland Cavaliers. Bosh and Andrea Bargnani recorded impressive numbers—with Bosh leading the league in rebounds and free throw attempts, and also as one of the top scorers—but the Raptors were slow off the blocks, going 7–8 in their first 15 games. In that period, although the Raptors was fourth in the league in number of points scored per game, they were second last in the league in number of points allowed per game as well. Newcomer Wright criticised the team for being unfocused in pre-game preparations, and appealed to team captain Bosh to change that. The Raptors persisted in being one of the worst defensive teams in the league, and their descent culminated in a 146–115 drubbing by the Atlanta Hawks—the second worst defeat in franchise history—bringing their record to 7–13. They were soon ranked last in most points allowed per 100 possessions, earning a defensive rating that was 10.8% worse than the second-last team, which was the largest disparity in NBA history. The team held a meeting to clear up communication issues among teammates, and this was followed by three consecutive wins.

Türkoğlu was having difficulty adapting to his new team, while injuries were also an issue for the Raptors: Evans had yet to feature with more than a third of the season gone, while Calderón missed a dozen after 20 games into the season. This, however, allowed front court role players like Johnson and Weems to pick up more minutes, and Jack to start at the point. Toronto compiled a 5-game winning streak—its best in years—to climb back into the playoff race, and found themselves 16–17 to round off the year after a bad start to December, and .500 after 36 games. They were able to maintain this record for the next few games, beating premier teams such as the San Antonio Spurs, Orlando Magic, Dallas Mavericks and Los Angeles Lakers along the way, while Bosh continued leading the league in double doubles and was only one of three players to average at least 20 points and 10 rebounds a game. By the time the All-Star break arrived, the team had a 29–23 record, going 18–6 after the emergency team meeting in mid-December, which was the second best in the league after Cleveland.

After hitting a season-high of six games above .500, Toronto's run of good form came to a halt after the All-Star break, due in large part to an injury to Bosh which occurred in a Feb. 17 OT loss to Memphis. The team struggled and went under .500 on 14 March 2010, going 32–33. Their form in March continued to be patchy, and their drop in the conference rankings resulted in a close jostle with the Chicago Bulls for the eighth and final playoffs spot. Triano also adjusted the starting lineup, moving Türkoğlu and DeRozan to the bench and Wright and Weems in the opposite direction. As the Bulls closed in on the Raptors, Bosh and Türkoğlu suffered injuries, with the former being ruled out of the regular season five games before it ended. When Chicago subsequently routed Toronto, the eighth spot remained up for grabs until the final day of the regular season: if Toronto beat New York and Chicago lost to Charlotte, Toronto would prevail as they led the head-to-head 2–1; however, while the Raptors defeated the Knicks, the Bulls won against the Bobcats and Chicago took the final spot, with a record of 41–41, one win above Toronto.

Standings

Record vs. opponents

Game log

Regular season

|- bgcolor="#bbffbb"
| 1
| October 28
| Cleveland
| 
| Andrea Bargnani (28)
| Chris Bosh (16)
| José Calderón (11)
| Air Canada Centre20,152
| 1–0
|- bgcolor="#ffcccc"
| 2
| October 30
| @ Memphis
| 
| Chris Bosh (37)
| Chris Bosh (12)
| Jarrett Jack (5)
| FedExForum10,563
| 1–1

|- bgcolor="#ffcccc"
| 3
| November 1
| Orlando
| 
| Chris Bosh (35)
| Chris Bosh (16)
| José Calderón (6)
| Air Canada Centre18,147
| 1–2
|- bgcolor="#bbffbb"
| 4
| November 4
| Detroit
| 
| Chris Bosh (25)
| Andrea Bargnani (12)
| Jarrett Jack, Hedo Türkoğlu (6)
| Air Canada Centre17,915
| 2–2
|- bgcolor="#bbffbb"
| 5
| November 6
| @ New Orleans
| 
| Chris Bosh (27)
| Andrea Bargnani (9)
| José Calderón (8)
| New Orleans Arena15,010
| 3–2
|- bgcolor="#ffcccc"
| 6
| November 7
| @ Dallas
| 
| Chris Bosh (26)
| Chris Bosh (12)
| José Calderón (7)
| American Airlines Center19,977
| 3–3
|- bgcolor="#ffcccc"
| 7
| November 9
| @ San Antonio
| 
| Chris Bosh (32)
| Chris Bosh (10)
| José Calderón (9)
| AT&T Center17,714
| 3–4
|- bgcolor="#bbffbb"
| 8
| November 11
| Chicago
| 
| Chris Bosh (28)
| Chris Bosh (11)
| José Calderón (6)
| Air Canada Centre16,310
| 4–4
|- bgcolor="#bbffbb"
| 9
| November 13
| @ L.A. Clippers
| 
| Chris Bosh (21)
| Chris Bosh (14)
| José Calderón (9)
| Staples Center15,615
| 5–4
|- bgcolor="#ffcccc"
| 10
| November 15
| @ Phoenix
| 
| Chris Bosh (25)
| Chris Bosh (10)
| José Calderón (7)
| US Airways Center16,605
| 5–5
|- bgcolor="#ffcccc"
| 11
| November 17
| @ Denver
| 
| DeMar DeRozan (17)
| Chris Bosh (14)
| José Calderón (7)
| Pepsi Center16,446
| 5–6
|- bgcolor="#ffcccc"
| 12
| November 18
| @ Utah
| 
| Chris Bosh (32)
| Chris Bosh (17)
| Jarrett Jack (5)
| EnergySolutions Arena17,789
| 5–7
|- bgcolor="#bbffbb"
| 13
| November 20
| Miami
| 
| Chris Bosh (29)
| Chris Bosh (12)
| José Calderón (10)
| Air Canada Centre19,800
| 6–7
|- bgcolor="#ffcccc"
| 14
| November 22
| Orlando
| 
| Chris Bosh (22)
| Andrea Bargnani (9)
| Jarrett Jack (11)
| Air Canada Centre17,233
| 6–8
|- bgcolor="#bbffbb"
| 15
| November 24
| Indiana
| 
| José Calderón (21)
| Chris Bosh (12)
| José Calderón, Hedo Türkoğlu (7)
| Air Canada Centre17,136
| 7–8
|- bgcolor="#ffcccc"
| 16
| November 25
| @ Charlotte
| 
| Chris Bosh (18)
| Chris Bosh (14)
| José Calderón (8)
| Time Warner Cable Arena13,689
| 7–9
|- bgcolor="#ffcccc"
| 17
| November 27
| @ Boston
| 
| Chris Bosh, Hedo Türkoğlu (20)
| Chris Bosh (13)
| Jarrett Jack (5)
| TD Garden18,624
| 7–10
|- bgcolor="#ffcccc"
| 18
| November 29
| Phoenix
| 
| Chris Bosh (30)
| Chris Bosh (17)
| José Calderón (7)
| Air Canada Centre17,721
| 7–11

|- bgcolor="#ffcccc"
| 19
| December 1
| Washington
| 
| Chris Bosh (22)
| Chris Bosh (14)
| Hedo Türkoğlu (6)
| Air Canada Centre15,776
| 7–12
|- bgcolor="#ffcccc"
| 20
| December 2
| @ Atlanta
| 
| DeMar DeRozan (21)
| Amir Johnson (7)
| Jarrett Jack (8)
| Philips Arena12,272
| 7–13
|- bgcolor="#bbffbb"
| 21
| December 4
| @ Washington
| 
| Chris Bosh (31)
| Chris Bosh (16)
| José Calderón (9)
| Verizon Center20,173
| 8–13
|- bgcolor="#bbffbb"
| 22
| December 5
| @ Chicago
| 
| Chris Bosh (25)
| Chris Bosh (12)
| Jarrett Jack (9)
| United Center20,481
| 9–13
|- bgcolor="#bbffbb"
| 23
| December 8
| Minnesota
| 
| Chris Bosh (21)
| Chris Bosh (16)
| Jarrett Jack (8)
| Air Canada Centre15,167
| 10–13
|- bgcolor="#ffcccc"
| 24
| December 9
| @ Milwaukee
| 
| Chris Bosh (26)
| Chris Bosh (10)
| Jarrett Jack (7)
| Air Canada Centre12,637
| 10–14
|- bgcolor="#ffcccc"
| 25
| December 11
| Atlanta
| 
| Andrea Bargnani (17)
| Chris Bosh (10)
| Hedo Türkoğlu (8)
| Air Canada Centre17,032
| 10–15
|- bgcolor="#bbffbb"
| 26
| December 13
| Houston
| 
| Chris Bosh (27)
| Jarrett Jack (8)
| Jarrett Jack (8)
| Air Canada Centre17,111
| 11–15
|- bgcolor="#ffcccc"
| 27
| December 15
| @ Miami
| 
| Chris Bosh (28)
| Andrea Bargnani, DeMar DeRozan (7)
| Chris Bosh, Hedo Türkoğlu (4)
| American Airlines Arena15,106
| 11–16
|- bgcolor="#ffcccc"
| 28
| December 16
| @ Orlando
| 
| Chris Bosh (20)
| Chris Bosh (6)
| Jarrett Jack (5)
| Amway Arena17,461
| 11–17
|- bgcolor="#bbffbb"
| 29
| December 18
| New Jersey
| 
| Amir Johnson (18)
| Chris Bosh (8)
| Jarrett Jack (9)
| Air Canada Centre15,901
| 12–17
|- bgcolor="#bbffbb"
| 30
| December 20
| New Orleans
| 
| Chris Bosh (25)
| Amir Johnson (12)
| Jarrett Jack, Hedo Türkoğlu (7)
| Air Canada Centre15,790
| 13–17
|- bgcolor="#bbffbb"
| 31
| December 23
| @ Detroit
| 
| Andrea Bargnani (21)
| Chris Bosh (9)
| Hedo Türkoğlu (11)
| The Palace of Auburn Hills19,396
| 14–17
|- bgcolor="#bbffbb"
| 32
| December 27
| Detroit
| 
| Chris Bosh (25)
| Chris Bosh (16)
| Hedo Türkoğlu (6)
| Air Canada Centre19,800
| 15–17
|- bgcolor="#bbffbb"
| 33
| December 30
| Charlotte
| 
| Chris Bosh (33)
| Chris Bosh (13)
| Jarrett Jack (6)
| Air Canada Centre18,979
| 16–17

|- bgcolor="#ffcccc"
| 34
| January 2
| @ Boston
| 
| Chris Bosh (25)
| Chris Bosh (9)
| Jarrett Jack, Hedo Türkoğlu (7)
| TD Garden18,624
| 16–18
|- bgcolor="#bbffbb"
| 35
| January 3
| San Antonio
| 
| Chris Bosh (22)
| Chris Bosh (15)
| Jarrett Jack (8)
| Air Canada Centre18,323
| 17–18
|- bgcolor="#bbffbb"
| 36
| January 6
| @ Orlando
| 
| Andrea Bargnani, Chris Bosh (18)
| Chris Bosh (12)
| José Calderón (8)
| Amway Arena17,461
| 18–18
|- bgcolor="#bbffbb"
| 37
| January 8
| @ Philadelphia
| 
| Chris Bosh (29)
| Chris Bosh (9)
| Chris Bosh (6)
| Wachovia Center15,264
| 19–18
|- bgcolor="#ffcccc"
| 38
| January 10
| Boston
| 
| Chris Bosh (31)
| Chris Bosh (13)
| Hedo Türkoğlu (9)
| Air Canada Centre19,800
| 19–19
|- bgcolor="#ffcccc"
| 39
| January 11
| @ Indiana
| 
| Chris Bosh (27)
| Andrea Bargnani (17)
| José Calderón (6)
| Conseco Fieldhouse11,039
| 19–20
|- bgcolor="#bbffbb"
| 40
| January 15
| @ New York
| 
| Andrea Bargnani (24)
| Andrea Bargnani (12)
| José Calderón (6)
| Madison Square Garden19,763
| 20–20
|- bgcolor="#bbffbb"
| 41
| January 17
| Dallas
| 
| Chris Bosh (23)
| Chris Bosh (13)
| José Calderón, Jarrett Jack (7)
| Air Canada Centre19,004
| 21–20
|- bgcolor="#ffcccc"
| 42
| January 19
| @ Cleveland
| 
| Chris Bosh (21)
| Chris Bosh (10)
| José Calderón (6)
| Quicken Loans Arena20,562
| 21–21
|- bgcolor="#ffcccc"
| 43
| January 20
| @ Milwaukee
| 
| Chris Bosh (44)
| Chris Bosh (12)
| José Calderón, Jarrett Jack (5)
| Bradley Center12,724
| 21–22
|- bgcolor="#bbffbb"
| 44
| January 22
| Milwaukee
| 
| Jarrett Jack (27)
| Antoine Wright (8)
| Hedo Türkoğlu (5)
| Air Canada Centre17,819
| 22–22
|- bgcolor="#bbffbb"
| 45
| January 24
| L.A. Lakers
| 
| Andrea Bargnani (22)
| Chris Bosh (13)
| José Calderón, Hedo Türkoğlu (5)
| Air Canada Centre20,111
| 23–22
|- bgcolor="#bbffbb"
| 46
| January 27
| Miami
| 
| Andrea Bargnani (27)
| Chris Bosh (18)
| José Calderón (7)
| Air Canada Centre18,265
| 24–22
|- bgcolor="#bbffbb"
| 47
| January 28
| @ New York
| 
| Chris Bosh (27)
| Chris Bosh (15)
| José Calderón (7)
| Madison Square Garden18,828
| 25–22
|- bgcolor="#bbffbb"
| 48
| January 31
| Indiana
| 
| Chris Bosh (26)
| Chris Bosh (15)
| Chris Bosh, José Calderón (7)
| Air Canada Centre16,715
| 26–22

|- bgcolor="#ffcccc"
| 49
| February 2
| @ Indiana
| 
| Chris Bosh (35)
| Chris Bosh (15)
| José Calderón (8)
| Conseco Fieldhouse11,191
| 26–23
|- bgcolor="#bbffbb"
| 50
| February 3
| New Jersey
| 
| Andrea Bargnani, Chris Bosh (20)
| Sonny Weems (11)
| Jarrett Jack (9)
| Air Canada Centre15,222
| 27–23
|- bgcolor="#bbffbb"
| 51
| February 7
| Sacramento
| 
| Chris Bosh (35)
| Chris Bosh (11)
| Jarrett Jack (9)
| Air Canada Centre18,007
| 28–23
|- bgcolor="#bbffbb"
| 52
| February 10
| Philadelphia
| 
| Chris Bosh (23)
| Chris Bosh (12)
| Jarrett Jack (8)
| Air Canada Centre16,651
| 29–23
|- bgcolor="#ffcccc"
| 53
| February 17
| Memphis
| 
| Chris Bosh (32)
| Andrea Bargnani, Chris Bosh (10)
| José Calderón (9)
| Air Canada Centre16,829
| 29–24
|- bgcolor="#bbffbb"
| 54
| February 19
| @ New Jersey
| 
| Jarrett Jack (18)
| Radoslav Nesterović (7)
| Jarrett Jack (10)
| Izod Center11,994
| 30–24
|- bgcolor="#bbffbb"
| 55
| February 20
| Washington
| 
| Jarrett Jack (23)
| Reggie Evans (7)
| Jarrett Jack (8)
| Air Canada Centre19,149
| 31–24
|- bgcolor="#ffcccc"
| 56
| February 24
| Portland
| 
| Hedo Türkoğlu (24)
| Reggie Evans, Amir Johnson (8)
| Jarrett Jack (8)
| Air Canada Centre16,161
| 31–25
|- bgcolor="#ffcccc"
| 57
| February 26
| Cleveland
| 
| Andrea Bargnani, Jarrett Jack (24)
| DeMar DeRozan, Reggie Evans (5)
| José Calderón (8)
| Air Canada Centre20,107
| 31–26
|- bgcolor="#ffcccc"
| 58
| February 28
| @ Oklahoma City
| 
| Andrea Bargnani, Sonny Weems (14)
| Amir Johnson (11)
| José Calderón (7)
| Ford Center18,203
| 31–27

|- bgcolor="#ffcccc"
| 59
| March 1
| @ Houston
| 
| Marcus Banks (15)
| Radoslav Nesterović (7)
| Jarrett Jack (6)
| Toyota Center13,943
| 31–28
|- bgcolor="#bbffbb"
| 60
| March 5
| New York
| 
| Sonny Weems (20)
| Hedo Türkoğlu, Sonny Weems (9)
| José Calderón (6)
| Air Canada Centre18,889
| 32–28
|- bgcolor="#ffcccc"
| 61
| March 7
| Philadelphia
| 
| Jarrett Jack (20)
| Chris Bosh (12)
| Jarrett Jack (9)
| Air Canada Centre18,736
| 32–29
|- bgcolor="#ffcccc"
| 62
| March 9
| @ L.A. Lakers
| 
| Chris Bosh (22)
| Andrea Bargnani (8)
| Jarrett Jack (7)
| Staples Center18,997
| 32–30
|- bgcolor="#ffcccc"
| 63
| March 10
| @ Sacramento
| 
| Andrea Bargnani (20)
| Hedo Türkoğlu (7)
| Chris Bosh, Jarrett Jack, Hedo Türkoğlu (3)
| ARCO Arena13,412
| 32–31
|- bgcolor="#ffcccc"
| 64
| March 13
| @ Golden State
| 
| Chris Bosh, José Calderón (24)
| Chris Bosh (11)
| José Calderón (12)
| Oracle Arena17,655
| 32–32
|- bgcolor="#ffcccc"
| 65
| March 14
| @ Portland
| 
| Chris Bosh (28)
| Chris Bosh (7)
| José Calderón (7)
| Rose Garden Arena20,639
| 32–33
|- bgcolor="#bbffbb"
| 66
| March 17
| Atlanta
| 
| Andrea Bargnani (22)
| Andrea Bargnani (11)
| José Calderón (6)
| Air Canada Centre18,441
| 33–33
|- bgcolor="#ffcccc"
| 67
| March 19
| Oklahoma City
| 
| Chris Bosh (22)
| Chris Bosh (10)
| Jarrett Jack (7)
| Air Canada Centre19,351
| 33–34
|- bgcolor="#bbffbb"
| 68
| March 20
| @ New Jersey
| 
| Chris Bosh (36)
| Chris Bosh, Jarrett Jack (8)
| José Calderón (8)
| Izod Center11,048
| 34–34
|- bgcolor="#bbffbb"
| 69
| March 22
| @ Minnesota
| 
| Chris Bosh (21)
| Chris Bosh (10)
| Jarrett Jack (8)
| Target Center14,554
| 35–34
|- bgcolor="#ffcccc"
| 70
| March 24
| Utah
| 
| Chris Bosh (20)
| Reggie Evans (9)
| Chris Bosh, José Calderón (3)
| Air Canada Centre16,178
| 35–35
|- bgcolor="#ffcccc"
| 71
| March 26
| Denver
| 
| Chris Bosh (18)
| Andrea Bargnani (15)
| Chris Bosh, José Calderón (6)
| Air Canada Centre19,800
| 35–36
|- bgcolor="#ffcccc"
| 72
| March 28
| @ Miami
| 
| Chris Bosh (19)
| Chris Bosh (6)
| José Calderón (7)
| American Airlines Arena19,600
| 35–37
|- bgcolor="#bbffbb"
| 73
| March 29
| @ Charlotte
| 
| Chris Bosh (22)
| Chris Bosh (11)
| José Calderón (7)
| Time Warner Cable Arena14,534
| 36–37
|- bgcolor="#bbffbb"
| 74
| March 31
| L.A. Clippers
| 
| Chris Bosh (34)
| Chris Bosh (11)
| Jarrett Jack (10)
| Air Canada Centre16,106
| 37–37

|- bgcolor="#bbffbb"
| 75
| April 3
| @ Philadelphia
| 
| Chris Bosh (28)
| Chris Bosh (12)
| José Calderón (10)
| Wachovia Center13,430
| 38–37
|- bgcolor="#ffcccc"
| 76
| April 4
| Golden State
| 
| Chris Bosh (42)
| Chris Bosh (12)
| Jarrett Jack (4)
| Air Canada Centre17,509
| 38–38
|- bgcolor="#ffcccc"
| 77
| April 6
| @ Cleveland
| 
| Jarrett Jack (23)
| Amir Johnson (10)
| Jarrett Jack (6)
| Quicken Loans Arena20,562
| 38–39
|- bgcolor="#ffcccc"
| 78
| April 7
| Boston
| 
| Sonny Weems (21)
| Antoine Wright (7)
| José Calderón (9)
| Air Canada Centre18,793
| 38–40
|- bgcolor="#ffcccc"
| 79
| April 9
| @ Atlanta
| 
| Amir Johnson, Sonny Weems (18)
| Amir Johnson (13)
| José Calderón (10)
| Philips Arena19,382
| 38–41
|- bgcolor="#ffcccc"
| 80
| April 11
| Chicago
| 
| Andrea Bargnani, Sonny Weems (18)
| Hedo Türkoğlu (19)
| Hedo Türkoğlu (9)
| Air Canada Centre19,515
| 38–42
|- bgcolor="#bbffbb"
| 81
| April 12
| @ Detroit
| 
| Andrea Bargnani (33)
| Hedo Türkoğlu (8)
| Jarrett Jack (12)
| The Palace of Auburn Hills22,076
| 39–42
|- bgcolor="#bbffbb"
| 82
| April 14
| New York
| 
| Andrea Bargnani, DeMar DeRozan (24)
| DeMar DeRozan (9)
| Jarrett Jack (6)
| Air Canada Centre18,333
| 40–42

Player statistics

Regular season

|-
| 
| 22 || 0 || 11.1 || .534 || .292 || .828 || 1.0 || 1.2 || .6 || .1 || 5.0
|-
| 
| 80 || style="background:#000000;color:#888888;"| 80 || 35.0 || .470 || .372 || .774 || 6.2 || 1.2 || .3 || style="background:#000000;color:#888888;"| 1.4 || 17.2
|-
| 
| 66 || 1 || 17.0 || .406 || .380 || .835 || 1.4 || 1.3 || .6 || .1 || 7.1
|-
| 
| | 70 || 70 || style="background:#000000;color:#888888;"| 36.1 || .518 || .364 || .797 || style="background:#000000;color:#888888;"| 10.8 || 2.4 || .6 || 1.0 || style="background:#000000;color:#888888;"| 24.0
|-
| 
| 68 || 39 || 26.7 || .482 || .398 || .798 || 2.1 || style="background:#000000;color:#888888;"| 5.9 || style="background:#000000;color:#888888;"| .7 || .1 || 10.3
|-
| 
| 77 || 65 || 21.6 || .498 || .250 || .763 || 2.9 || .7 || .6 || .2 || 8.6
|-
| 
| 0 || 0 || .0 || .000 || .000 || .000 || .0 || .0 || .0 || .0 || .0
|-
| 
| 28 || 1 || 11.1 || .493 || .000 || .450 || 3.8 || .3 || .5 || .1 || 3.4
|-
| 
| style="background:#000000;color:#888888;"| 82 || 43 || 27.4 || .481 || style="background:#000000;color:#888888;"| .412 || style="background:#000000;color:#888888;"| .842 || 2.7 || 5.0 || style="background:#000000;color:#888888;"| .7 || .1 || 11.4
|-
| 
| style="background:#000000;color:#888888;"| 82 || 5 || 17.7 || style="background:#000000;color:#888888;"| .623 || .000 || .638 || 4.8 || .6 || .5 || 0.8 || 6.2
|-
| 
| 42 || 8 || 9.8 || .544 || .000 || .200 || 2.1 || .6 || .2 || .4 || 3.9
|-
| 
| 11 || 0 || 4.6 || .533 || .000 || .500 || 1.0 || .1 || .2 || .4 || 1.7
|-
| 
| 74 || 69 || 30.7 || .409 || .374 || .774 || 4.6 || 4.1 || style="background:#000000;color:#888888;"| .7 || .4 || 11.3
|-
| 
| 69 || 19 || 19.8 || .515 || .133 || .688 || 2.8 || 1.5 || .6 || .4 || 7.5
|-
| 
| 67 || 10 || 20.8 || .406 || .335 || .688 || 2.8 || 1.1 || .4 || .2 || 6.5
|}

Transactions

Trades

Free agents

References

External links

 2009–10 Toronto Raptors season at ESPN
 2009–10 Toronto Raptors season at Basketball Reference

Toronto Raptors seasons
Toronto
Tor